Patrick W. Kenny (died 22 April 1931) was an Irish politician. He was a Cumann na nGaedheal member of the Free State Seanad Éireann from 1922 to 1931. He was elected to Free State Seanad in 1922 for 9 years and served until his death in office on 22 April 1931. He was elected Leas-Chathaoirleach (deputy chairperson) of the Seanad on 12 December 1928.

References

Year of birth missing
1931 deaths
Cumann na nGaedheal senators
Members of the 1922 Seanad
Members of the 1925 Seanad
Members of the 1928 Seanad